Doris Willette  (born February 11, 1988 in Lafayette, California
) is an American foil fencer. Her mother is an immigrant from Taiwan. Willette was named to the U.S. Olympic team at the 2012 Summer Olympics in the women's foil team competition.
 
Willette is a graduate of Penn State University. She won NCAA Championships in foil in 2009 and 2011.  Willette won a gold medal in the team foil competition at the 2011 Pan American Games.

See also
List of Pennsylvania State University Olympians

References

1988 births
American female foil fencers
American sportspeople of Taiwanese descent
American sportswomen of Chinese descent
Fencers at the 2012 Summer Olympics
Living people
Olympic fencers of the United States
Pan American Games medalists in fencing
Pan American Games gold medalists for the United States
Fencers at the 2011 Pan American Games
Medalists at the 2011 Pan American Games
21st-century American women